Avispas de Santiago de Cuba (English: Santiago de Cuba Wasps) is a baseball team in the Cuban National Series based in Estadio Guillermón Moncada in Santiago de Cuba.  The Avispas (Wasps) are historically one of the most successful teams in the National Series, the main domestic competition in post-revolutionary Cuban baseball. The team is similar to the Boston Red Sox in the MLB in the sense that they have fans all over the country (especially in the east), and are the eternal rivals of Industriales, the New York Yankees of Cuban baseball. The traditional rivalry on the baseball diamond also represents the rivalry between the two cities (La Habana and Santiago de Cuba) dating back to the era when Cuba was a colony of Spain two centuries ago. The Super Classic of the Cuban National Series between EB Santiago de Cuba and Industriales takes place six times per season.

The Avispas have won eight Cuban National Series championships, including three straight titles during the 1998-99, 1999-2000, and 2000-01 seasons. Santiago's latest Cuban National Series championship came in the 2007-2008 season,  defeating Pinar del Rio in a 4 game sweep.

Santiago de Cuba has sent one player to the 2006 World Baseball Classic, pitcher Ormari Romero; and four players to the 2009 World Baseball Classic: Luis Miguel Navas, Norge Luis Vera, Hector Olivera and Rolando Meriño. Two Avispas have gone to the Olympic Games, Rey Isaac in 1996, and Danny Betancourt in 2004. In each year, the Cuban team won gold.

Roster

Notable players
Ronnier Mustelier

References

Baseball teams in Cuba
Santiago de Cuba